Jean d'Esme (27 September 1893 – 24 February 1966) was a French writer and journalist.

Biography
Born Jean Marie Henri d'Esmenard in Shanghai, China, he studied in Paris in National School of Overseas France. After turning to journalism and travelling, he took the pseudonym Jean d'Esme and started writing for magazines Je sais tout, Le Matin and L'Intransigeant. In 1936, d'Esme produced a film in location of eastern Niger. He wrote a series of articles for L'Écho de Paris regarding Ethiopia. He became known for his adventure novels, most notably The Red Gods. During Spanish Civil War d'Esme was imprisoned for filming in prohibited areas. He has written a number of books for children.

References

1894 births
1966 deaths
French children's writers
French male non-fiction writers
20th-century French journalists
20th-century French male writers
20th-century pseudonymous writers